Pavia is a town and commune in Italy.

Pavia may also refer to:

 Ticinum, the ancient city that became the modern Italian town
 Pavia, Iloilo, a municipality in the Philippines
 Giacomo Pavia (1655-1740), 16th-century Italian painter
 Manuel Pavía y Lacy 19th-century Spanish general

See also
 17 Motorised Division Pavia, a World War II Italian infantry division
 Pavia di Udine, an Italian municipality in province of Udine
 Pavia Township, Bedford County, Pennsylvania, in the United States